Acanthorrhinum is a monotypic genus in the family Plantaginaceae that contains only the species Acanthorrhinum ramosissimum. It is found in Spain and North Africa.

References

Plantaginaceae
Plantaginaceae genera
Monotypic Lamiales genera